"Did You See" is a 2017 song by English rapper J Hus from his debut album Common Sense. It was the first top ten single for J Hus in the United Kingdom and has been certified platinum by the British Phonographic Industry. An official music video was released to J Hus' Vevo page on YouTube on 2 March 2017.

Charts

Weekly charts

Year-end charts

Certifications

References

2017 songs
2017 singles
J Hus songs
Songs written by J Hus